Metal Shark Boats is an American developer and builder of aluminum-hull vessels that operates shipyards in Jeanerette and Franklin, Louisiana.
It offers a variety of vessels ranging from commercial transportation to specialized law enforcement and military applications.

The company was founded as Gravois Aluminum Boats in 1986, building primarily small recreational vessels, but as sales declined Gravois incorporated Metal Shark in 2005 with the goal of attracting governmental and commercial clients. In December 2014, Metal Shark reached an agreement with the Damen Group to market and build Damen-designed ships. As of 2016, Metal Shark had built about a thousand vessels for operators around the world.

Metal Shark won the $54 million contract to build 13 Defiant class patrol vessels, under the supervision of the US Navy, intended to be given the USA's Caribbean neighbours.  The class of vessels is based on the Damen Stan 2606 design—the same design nearby rival Bollinger shipyards used for the US Coast Guard's very successful Marine Protector class of cutters.

Metal Shark manufactures a smaller class of  patrol vessels, also called the Defiant class.  Metal Shark delivered the first of several Defiant class vessels to Senegal and Cabo Verde on February 18, 2018.  Those vessels were gifts from the USA.

Operators
Operators of Metal Shark Boats:
 
 
 
 
 
  Cape Verdean Armed Forces
 
  Djiboutian Navy
 
  Guyana Coast Guard
 
 
 
  Military Naval Forces of the Armed Forces of Ukraine
  Ukrainian Sea Guard

References

Manufacturing companies based in Louisiana
American boat builders